The NightMoves Awards are given annually in the pornographic film industry by NightMoves, an Oldsmar, Florida-based magazine which was first published in 1987 and initially titled Sports South. The awards began in 1993 and were initially titled the Central Florida Adult Entertainment Awards. It is the third oldest continuously running adult awards show in the United States, after the AVN Awards and the XRCO Awards. It also marks the start of the porn industry's awards season. In addition to the show's national awards, local awards are also given to sexually oriented businesses and dancers in the Tampa Bay Area. Two awards are given for each national category: one which is chosen by fans and the other one which is chosen by the editors of NightMoves magazine. An online voting ballot is available for approximately three months every year for the fan's choice awards. Recipients of the editor's choice awards are chosen based on film reviews.

The awards have been held at several different venues throughout the Tampa Bay Area, including The Krush in Tampa in 1995, and 1996, Club XS in Downtown Tampa in 1997, 1998, and 1999, Stormin's Palace in Clearwater in 2000, 2001, and 2004, the Pinellas Expo Center in Pinellas Park in 2002, club Twilight in Tampa in 2003, Bricktown 54 in Clearwater in 2005, 2006, and 2007, the Dallas Bull in Tampa in 2008, 2009, 2010, 2011, and 2012, and the Tampa Gold Club in 2013, 2014, and 2015. Pornographic actor Ron Jeremy has hosted every show so far.

The NightMoves Awards added a new a category titled the Triple-Play Award in 2006. Also known as the Anna Award, it was created in honor of the late pornographic actress Anna Malle. Recipients of the award are recognized for their excellence in at least three different fields of the adult entertainment industry, such as performing, directing, and feature dancing. The first recipient of the award was Stormy Daniels. In 2007, NightMoves added a Hall of Fame to its awards show. Two additional award categories were also added that year: Best All Girl Release and Best Comedy or Parody Release. In 2012, the show added award categories for Best Social Media Star, Best Website (individual performer), Best Multi-site Network, Best Parody – Comedy, Best Parody – Drama, Best Parody – Super Hero, Best Boobs, Best Ass, Best Overall Body, Best Latina Performer, Best Transsexual Performer, and Best Transsexual Release.

National award winners

Best Actor

Best Actress

Best Adult Internet Site

Best All Girl Release

Best All Sex/Gonzo Release

Best Anal Release

Best BBW Performer

Best BBW Release

Best Body

Best Boobs

Best Butt

Best Compilation Release

Best Cam Model, Individual Site

Best Cougar/MILF Release

Best Director

Best Director — Feature

Best Director — Non-Feature

Best Director – Non-Parody

Best Director — Parody

Best DVD

Best Ethnic Performer

Best Ethnic Release

Best Feature Dancer

Best Feature Production

Best Female Performer

Best Fetish/Specialty Release

Best Girl/Girl Performer

Best Individual Website

Best Ink

Best Interracial/Ethnic Series

Best Latina Performer

Best Live Webcam

Best Male Performer

Best MILF Performer

Best MILF Release

Best New Director

Best New Production Company

Best New Starlet

Best Parody (Comedy)

Best Parody (Drama)

Best Parody Release

Best Parody (Superhero)

Best Production Company

Best Series

Best Star Showcase

Best Transsexual Director

Best Transexual Performer

Best Transexual Release

Best Video Packaging

Unsung Performer of the Year

First Choice Awards

Lifetime Achievement Award

Miss Congeniality

NightMoves Hall of Fame

Social Media Star

Triple Play Award

Behind The Scenes Award

References

External links

 

1993 establishments in Florida
American pornographic film awards
Annual events in Florida
Awards established in 1993
Mass media in the Tampa Bay area
Pornography in Florida